The Journal of Pain & Palliative Care Pharmacotherapy is a quarterly peer-reviewed medical journal covering advances in acute, chronic, and end-of-life symptom management. It is published by Informa Healthcare and the editor in chief is Arthur G. Lipman (University of Utah Health Sciences Center). The journal was established in 1993 as the Journal of Pharmaceutical Care in Pain & Symptom Control, obtaining its current title in 2001.

Abstracting and indexing 
The journal is abstracted and indexed in:

References

External links 
 

Publications established in 1993
Anesthesiology and palliative medicine journals
Quarterly journals
Taylor & Francis academic journals
English-language journals